Sher Bahadur Thapa VC (20 November 1921 – 19 September 1944) was a Nepalese Gurkha recipient of the Victoria Cross, the highest and most prestigious award for gallantry in the face of the enemy that can be awarded to British and Commonwealth forces.

Details

He belonged to the Thapa Chhetri of Lamichhane Thapa clan and was a son of Ramdhoj Thapa, a permanent resident of Ghalechap of Tanahu, Nepal.

His citation in the London Gazette reads: 

His Victoria Cross is currently held by his regiment 9 Gorkha Rifles.

See also
Thaman Gurung
List of Brigade of Gurkhas recipients of the Victoria Cross

References
Notes

Sources
Monuments to Courage (David Harvey, 1999)
The Register of the Victoria Cross (This England, 1997)

External links
Sher Bahadur Thapa
Victoria Crosses have been won by Gurkha Regiments at www.nepalesekhukuri.com

1921 births
1944 deaths
Nepalese World War II recipients of the Victoria Cross
Indian Army personnel killed in World War II
British Indian Army soldiers
Gurkhas
People from Tanahun District